Nikita Petrov (born 1 July 1996) is a Russian chess player. He was awarded the title of Grandmaster by FIDE in 2018. 

Together with 43 other Russian chess players, Petrov signed an open letter to Russian president Vladimir Putin, protesting against the 2022 Russian invasion of Ukraine and expressing solidarity with the  Ukrainian people.

Career
In 2016, Petrov won the 38th International Chess Festival Città di Arco Open A with 8 out of 9, and again in 2017 and 2019 with the same score.

In 2019, he scored 7.5 out of 11, finishing in 17th place, at the European Individual Chess Championship, which qualified him for the Chess World Cup 2019, where he was defeated by Evgeny Tomashevsky in the first round. In the 6th Arica Open in 2019 he tied 2nd-8th place with Jose Eduardo Martinez Alcantara, Deivy Vera Siguenas, Renato R. Quintiliano Pinto, Cristobal Henriquez Villagra, Salvador Alonso, and Diego Saul Rod Flores Quillas.

In the 2021 Tuapse Open, he tied 2nd-4th place with Boris Grachev and Dmitry Kryakvin. In 2021 Petrov won the 17th Ugra Governor`s Cup in Khanty-Mansiysk ahead of Dmitry Kokarev and Daniil Lintchevski.

References

External links
 Nikita Petrov chess games at 365Chess.com
 

1996 births
Living people
Chess grandmasters
Russian chess players